The 1996 NCAA Skiing Championships were contested at the Bridger Bowl Ski Area in Bozeman, Montana as part of the 43rd annual NCAA-sanctioned ski tournament to determine the individual and team national champions of men's and women's collegiate slalom and cross-country skiing in the United States.

Utah, coached by Pat Miller, won the team championship, the Utes' eighth title overall and seventh as a co-ed team.

Venue

This year's NCAA skiing championships were hosted at the Bridger Bowl Ski Area near Bozeman, Montana.

These were the fourth championships held in the state of Montana (1960, 1983, 1985, and 1996).

Program

Men's events
 Cross country, 20 kilometer classical
 Cross country, 10 kilometer freestyle
 Slalom
 Giant slalom

Women's events
 Cross country, 15 kilometer classical
 Cross country, 5 kilometer freestyle
 Slalom
 Giant slalom

Team scoring

 DC – Defending champions
 Debut team appearance

See also
 List of NCAA skiing programs

References

1996 in sports in Montana
NCAA Skiing Championships
NCAA Skiing Championships
1996 in alpine skiing
1996 in cross-country skiing